Rajeev Janardan (born 1967) is an Indian classical sitar player of the Imdadkhani gharana (school), taught by Bimalendu Mukherjee. He lives in New Delhi.

At the age of 15, Janardan won the All India Music Competition. He also won the Prayag Sangit Samiti All-India Music Competition and the Sur Singar Samsad competition in Mumbai, and at the age of 19, he became an A grade artist of All India Radio and Doordarshan.

Following on from good reviews for a performance at the India International Centre in 1996, he has performed extensively both within India and overseas, including Switzerland in 2008. In his playing, he strives to blend gayaki ang (vocal style) and tantra ang (instrumental style). It is characterised by accurate meend, advanced surlagao, fast and clear taankari in gat and dirdir and chikari variations in jhala.

Janaradan also has a master's degree in psychology.

References 

1967 births
Living people
Hindustani instrumentalists
Indian male classical musicians
Sitar players
Surbahar players
Etawah gharana